Stathmopoda caminora is a species of moth in the family Stathmopodidae. It was first described by Edward Meyrick in 1890 and is endemic to New Zealand.

References

Moths described in 1890
Stathmopodidae
Moths of New Zealand
Endemic fauna of New Zealand
Taxa named by Edward Meyrick
Endemic moths of New Zealand